The 1959–60 Landsdelsserien was a Norwegian second-tier football league season.

The league was contested by 54 teams, divided into a total of seven groups from four districts; Østland/Søndre, Østland/Nordre, Sørland/Vestre and Møre/Trøndelag. The two group winners in the Østland districts, Ørn and Frigg promoted directly to the 1960–61 Hovedserien. The other five group winners qualified for promotion play-offs to compete for two spots in the following season's top flight. Stavanger and Rosenborg won the play-offs and were promoted.

Tables

District Østland/Søndre

District Østland/Nordre

District Sørland/Vestland

Group A

Group B

Group C

District Møre/Trøndelag

Møre

Trøndelag

Promotion play-offs
Sørland/Vestland 
Results
Vindbjart 1–1 Stavanger
Årstad 2–2 Vindbjart
Stavanger 1–3 Årstad

Møre/Trøndelag
Rosenborg 4–0 Kristiansund
Kristiansund 0–5 Rosenborg

Rosenborg won 9–0 on aggregate and were promoted to Hovedserien.

References

Norwegian First Division seasons
1959 in Norwegian football
1960 in Norwegian football
Norway